Rhagoletis suavis, also known as the walnut husk maggot, is a species of tephritid or fruit fly in the family Tephritidae. This fly is closely related to, but not to be confused with, Rhagoletis juglandis, or the walnut husk fly. It occurs in North America.

References

suavis
Diptera of North America
Insects described in 1862
Taxa named by Hermann Loew